João Filipe Caldas Amorim (born 30 September 1991) is a Portuguese professional footballer who plays as a right-back.

Club career
Born in Lisbon, Amorim joined Clube Oriental de Lisboa's academy at the age of 14. He went on to spend seven seasons as a senior with the first team, five in the third division and two in the second.

Amorim played his first match in the second tier on 4 January 2015, featuring 90 minutes in a 2–1 away win against Leixões SC. He scored his first goal in the competition on 15 August of the same year, his header earning the hosts one point in the last minute to close the 4–4 home draw with Vitória de Guimarães B.

In July 2017, Amorim signed with Spanish Tercera División club CF Salmantino UDS alongside his compatriot Bruno Miranda.

References

External links

Portuguese League profile 

1991 births
Living people
Portuguese footballers
Footballers from Lisbon
Association football defenders
Liga Portugal 2 players
Segunda Divisão players
Clube Oriental de Lisboa players
Tercera División players
Salamanca CF UDS players
Portuguese expatriate footballers
Expatriate footballers in Spain
Portuguese expatriate sportspeople in Spain